Gale International is a privately owned real estate development company based in New York City. With roots dating back to 1922, the company is active in North America and Asia, specializing in city-scale, commercial, mixed-use, and golf course developments.

History 
In 1922 Daniel Gale founded the Daniel Gale Agency, a residential real estate development and brokerage company based in Long Island, New York.  Daniel Gale’s son, Kent Gale, expanded the firm to become one of the largest privately owned real estate brokerages in the U.S., known today as Daniel Gale Sotheby’s International Realty.  

Kent Gale’s son Stan Gale founded The Gale Company in 1985.  By 1990, the company had amassed a $500 million portfolio of development properties. Working with partners such as JP Morgan, Morgan Stanley and SL Green, The Gale Company diversified into investment, development, property management, leasing and global facilities management, culminating in a sale to Mack-Cali Realty in 2008 for $545 million. The transaction was then one of the largest sales of a privately owned company to a public REIT (real estate investment trust).

U.S. Development 
Notable U.S. projects include the relocation of the U.S. headquarters of Sanofi-Aventis Group to Bridgewater, New Jersey, in a $250 million lease transaction. One Lincoln Street, a landmark 1.1M SF speculative office tower in Boston’s Financial District, was 100% leased to State Street Financial while under construction and subsequently sold in 2004 for $705 million, which was, at the time, the most valuable commercial real estate transaction in Boston's history.

The Gale Company’s first golf course-centric master planned community was the Ibis Golf and Country Club in West Palm Beach, comprising 2,500 homes and three Nicklaus golf courses, completed in 1996. One of the company’s noteworthy mixed-use projects is the Green at Florham Park (New Jersey), a 270-acre joint venture with The Rockefeller Group that includes a new headquarters and training facility for the New York Jets professional football team, age-restricted housing, a luxury hotel and an office complex.

Recent projects include the 21W20 residential condominium in New York City’s Flatiron District, and the Campus at Greenhill, a 300,000 SF Class A office complex located on 104 acres, in Wallingford, CT.  

In February 2022, Daniel Gale Sotheby's International Realty celebrated its centennial with a celebration at the UBS Arena in New York.

International Development 
In 2004 Stan Gale created Gale International to focus on international development. The company serves as the principal developer of Songdo International Business District (Songdo IBD), a 1500-acre (6 sq km) greenfield city-scale project located on the west coast of South Korea.  In this endeavor, Gale partnered with leading urban development companies, such as Nicklaus Design, Kohn Pedersen Fox, Arup Engineering,  Whitman Strategy Group, United Technologies, Cisco Systems, Parsons Brinckerhoff, among others.

In 2009 Gale International served as the master plan developer for the 1,700-acre (7 sq km) Meixi Lake development project, located in Changsha, Hunan Province. The master plan was then executed by the Changsha Municipal Government and local authorities.

Sustainability and Wellness 
To achieve the mandate for Songdo set forth by the South Korean government, which called for a state-of-the-art urban development built to international standards, Gale applied the U.S. Green Building Council’s LEED certification system to the Songdo IBD project.  Songdo IBD boasts over 20 million sq ft of LEED-certified space, including the nation’s first LEED-certified residential building (Central Park residential), LEED-certified school (Chadwick International), LEED-certified hotel (Sheraton Incheon), and Asia’s first LEED-certified convention center (Convensia). 

The company’s 21W 20th St residential project earned the world’s first ever WELL certification under the WELL building standard, a system that measures the residential environment’s impact on residents’ health and wellness.

Projects
Projects by type:

City Scale
 Songdo International Business District, Songdo
 Meixi Lake, China

Residential
 21W20, New York
 Canal Walk, Songdo, Korea
 The # First World, Songdo, Korea
 The # Central Park, Songdo, Korea
 The # Central Park II, Songdo, Korea

Public Space
 Convensia, Songdo, Korea
 Central Park, Songdo, Korea

Golf Courses
 Jack Nicklaus Golf Course Korea, Songdo, Korea
 Ibis Golf and Country Club, Florida

Commercial
 North East Asia Trade Tower (NEATT), Songdo, Korea
 Campus at Green Hill, Wallingford, Connecticut
 One Lincoln Street, Boston, Massachusetts
 The Green at Florham Park, New Jersey

Education
 Chadwick International School, Songdo

References

International Business Times, November 22, 2006 - City Tests Digital Limits in SKorea
Newsworld Korea - Landmarks in New Songdo City - Breaking-ground for 65-Story Office Tower
 Boston Business Journal - October 19, 2006 - Gale, Vornado formalize plans to redevelop Filene's building

External links
Gale International
Corporate Housing
Medium Real Estate
Section 8 Housing Listings
Real Estate Investment Fund
New Songdo City Development

Companies based in New York City
Real estate companies of the United States